Port Havannah is a port village on Efate Island in Vanuatu.

History

World War II
With Japanese forces establishing bases on Guadalcanal which threatened the sea route between the U.S. and Australia, Admiral King distributed the joint basic plan for the occupation and defense of Efate on 20 March 1942. Under its terms the US Army was to defend Efate and support the defense of ships and positions. The US Navy's task was: (1) to construct, administer and operate a naval advance base, seaplane base, and harbor facilities; (2) to support Army forces in the defense of the island; (3) to construct an airfield and at least two outlying dispersal fields; (4) to provide facilities for the operation of seaplane-bombers.

On 25 March 1942, the Army sent about 500 men to Efate from Noumea, and the 4th Defense Battalion, 45th Marines, arrived on 8 April. Elements of the 1st Naval Construction Battalion arrived on Efate on 4 May 1942.

Seaplane Base
A detachment of Seebees went north to Havannah Harbour to construct a seaplane base to serve a squadron of PBYs. The Seabees built two seaplane ramps of coral, surfaced with wire mesh, and provided buoys for mooring 14 seaplanes. By 1 June, the PBYs began operating from the new base, bombing the Japanese positions on Guadalcanal. In addition to the ramps and moorings, two small piers, two nose hangars, one  by  seaplane workshop, four 5,000-gallon underground gasoline tanks, and housing facilities for 25 officers and 210 men in quonset huts were constructed.

US Navy units based at the base included:
VP-71 operating PBYs 29 June-20 July 1942

Havannah Harbour Field

See also
Bauerfield International Airport
Quoin Hill Airfield

References

Populated places in Vanuatu
Shefa Province
World War II airfields in the Pacific Ocean Theater
Airports in Vanuatu
Airfields of the United States Navy
1942 establishments in the New Hebrides

1945 disestablishments in Oceania
Closed installations of the United States Navy